Perdón Por Extrañarte is the sixth studio album released by Los Mismos on November 13, 2001. The band left EMI Latin and signed with Univision Music Group. The band made an appearance on Sabado Gigante performing Se Fué.

Jose "Pepe" Guadarrama departed from the band and was replaced by Gustavo Morales.

Track listing

References

2001 albums
Spanish-language albums
Los Mismos albums